Lochgilphead is a town and former burgh in Argyll and Bute, Scotland, United Kingdom, with a population of around 2,300 people. It is the administrative centre of Argyll and Bute. The village lies at the end of Loch Gilp (a branch of Loch Fyne) and lies on the banks of the Crinan Canal.

The council is based at Kilmory Castle, around which is located a woodland park and an Iron Age fort. Forestry and Land Scotland also have an office there.

Lochgilphead's facilities include a swimming pool, sports centre, fishing tackle shop, Virgin MoneyBank and 
Bank of Scotland, TSB (which closed permanently on 17 February 2021), Co-op Food supermarket, an ethical food store with deli, two petrol stations, one homewear shop and one hardware shop, a Renault dealership, a community hospital run by the local GPs (with an A&E department and a psychiatric hospital), a nine-hole golf course, bowling club, a hydrotherapy pool, a regional landfill site at Dunchologan, and Lochgilphead High School. There is also a local detachment of the Army Cadet Force in the town, specifically a branch of the Argyll and Sutherland Highlanders in conjunction with the Royal Regiment of Scotland. Daily bus services run from the town to other parts of Scotland, notably Glasgow, Campbeltown, Fort William, and Oban.

The town is home to shinty team Kilmory Camanachd and football team, Lochgilphead Red Star.

History
As a planned settlement, Lochgilphead was created in 1790, shortly after the completion of a road from Inveraray to Campbeltown. After the completion of the Crinan Canal in 1801, the town became more important as a link across the Kintyre peninsula. When a road was completed in 1830, Lochgilphead was linked to Oban. In 1831 a pier was built, promoting maritime transit between Lochgilphead and Glasgow, and other ports along the Irish Sea.

In 1975 Lochgilphead was chosen as the administrative headquarters of the Argyll and Bute District Council as part of local government reorganisation, due to its central location.

There are a large number of Neolithic remains, including cup and ring marks in the nearby Kilmartin Glen.

Climate

Lochgilphead has an oceanic climate (Köppen: Cfb).
The 2 weather stations are at Lephinmore and the other at Dunchologan-Lingerton waste disposal landfill site. During some winter / spring high tides, coinciding with stormy weather, some of the buildings along the front short line can be susceptible to some flooding. The Badden Burn and Crinan Canal are the primary sources of river flood risk in the area to the north of the town, causing around £70,000 of damage each year to the (approx) 20 residential and 10 business properties at risk as well as the A816 leading north out of Lochgilphead.

Education

Lochgilphead Joint Campus is sited on the outskirts of the town and has a capacity of 727, with the Secondary School section drawing pupils from the wider mid-Argyll region. The Campus opened in October 2007, replacing the separate Primary School and High School.

Argyll College has two sites in Lochgilphead, one in Lorne Street, and the purpose built Construction Skill Centre in Kilmory Industrial Estate.

Lochgilphead settlement profile 2014 - Highlands and Islands Enterprise

Total population was 3,825 in 2011, an increase of 3.2 per cent from 2001. By industry of employment, a higher share of employment in construction, public administration and defence, and health and social work than the Highlands and Islands and Scotland. By occupation, a higher share of employment in caring, leisure and other services, and sales and customer services than the Highlands and Islands and Scotland. Unemployment rates have increased to above the Argyll and the Islands, Highlands and Islands and Scotland rates. The annualised Jobseekers Allowance claimant count rate in 2013 was 4.0 per cent in Lochgilphead, 3.2 per cent in Argyll and the Islands, 2.4 per cent in Highlands and Islands and 3.7 per cent across Scotland. There is a smaller proportion of the adult population with no qualifications compared to Argyll and the Islands, the Highlands and Islands and Scotland, and more qualified with degree-level qualifications.

Healthcare

There are two hospitals in Lochgilphead:

The Argyll and Bute Hospital, which services include Acute Admission ward, Psychiatric ICU, Rehabilitation Services, Adult Psychotherapy Services and Mental Health Outpatient Services. It also has Occupational Therapy, Physiotherapy (Mental Health), a Learning Disability Service, Advocacy Service, Clinical Psychology, Substance Misuse Team and Child and Adolescent Mental Health Services (CAMHS).
The Mid Argyll Community Hospital and Integrated Care Centre, which has a Community Casualty Department, Radiography Department, GP Practice, Acute/Rehabilitation Inpatient Ward, Social Work Department and AHPs, with associated services including Dementia Services, Maternity Unit, Dental and Community Nursing Service and Child Health

Sports and leisure
 Mid Argyll Community Pool – a  social enterprise swimming pool.
 Mid Argyll Sports Centre – a sports centre with a multi use-games hall, dance studio, Squash Court, Gymnasium, CV Fitness Suite and a Resistance Room, as well as outdoor facilities, including full-size G2 floodlight football/hockey pitch, which can be subdivided into training pitches and four tennis courts, as well as two grass training pitches.
 Lochgilphead Bowling Club, bowling green and clubhouse based at Bank Park.
 Lochgilphead Library – library based at Manse Brae that has six computers for free public use, a dedicated children's area, full disabled access and also a baby-changing facility.
 Cycling – there are many cycle routes in the Lochgilphead area to cater for every level, from the Crinan Canal Towpath to the purpose-built Fire Tower Mountain Bike Trail, with a long, hard forestry climb linking on to some single track which includes berms, jumps, drop-offs and a section of north shore (raised wooden platform).
 Shinty MacCrae Park – the town's shinty pitch, and the home of Kilmory Camanachd Shinty Club.
 Putting – the Front Green is home to an 18 hole putting green, which operates seasonally.
 Fishing – there are many fishing locations around Lochgilphead which cater for sea, river, and loch fishing.
 Mid Argyll Motocross Club has a track and hold events (including Scottish Championship) at Achnashelloch.

Community and culture

In July 1982, Lochgilphead competed against teams from Perth and Oban in the then highly popular BBC Television It's a Knockout, presented by Stuart Hall. The town's team won their round and later competed in the international version of the series, 'Jeux Sans Frontieres', which was recorded in Switzerland.

Dalriada Provincial Mod

The town annually hosts the Dalriada Provincial Mod each September. The event is a Gaelic festival organised by the local branch of An Comunn Gàidhealach, which provides opportunities for people of all ages to perform across a range of competitive disciplines including Gaelic music and song, highland dancing, instrumental, drama, sport, and literature.

Filmography

In the World War Two film, 633 Squadron, Lochgilphead's main street features briefly in an aerial shot, as the bombers of 633rd Squadron fly over the unnamed town en-route to the target in Norway. The James Bond film From Russia with Love used locations in Lochgilphead for shots. The local cinema was used to watch screen rushes each day for the cast and crew.

Mid Argyll Music Festival

The town is one of the venues for the Mid Argyll Music Festival, which runs for around 2 weeks annually.

Lochgilphead Lantern Parade And Firework Display

This annual winter event had developed into one of the major highlights in the Argyll area, attracting crowds from near and far. However, the Lantern Parade did not occur in November 2014 after the organising committee responsible for previous events announced they would not continue in May 2014.

Invention and discovery

The Argyll Turbo GT sportscar was built by Bob Henderson in Manse Brae.

Mid Argyll Show

Lochgilphead hosts The Mid-Argyll Agricultural Show, which is a major event held annually on the second Saturday in August.

Notable people
 The singer Sydney MacEwan had built, and was for a time parish priest of St Margaret's Church in the town
 The footballer Neil Dewar was born in the town
 Martha Payne, the subject of a censorship controversy over a blog
 Architect William Fraser was born in the town

References

External links

  periodical for Lochgilphead and mid-Argyll news
 

 
Towns in Argyll and Bute
Highlands and Islands of Scotland
County towns in Scotland
Populated places established in 1790